Khayr Vahdat FK is a football club from Vahdat, Tajikistan who have played in the Tajik League, the top division in Tajikistan, since 2010.

History
Sharif Nazarov was appointed as the club's manager on 17 March 2016.

Domestic history

Performance in AFC competitions

Managers
 Tokhirjon Muminov (2010–2012)
 Yusuf Abdulloev (2012–2013)
 Rustam Khojaev (2013–2014)
 Pyotr Kachura (2014)
 Tokhirjon Muminov (2014–)

References

External links
Official Site
 Varzish sport

Football clubs in Tajikistan
Association football clubs established in 2009